Amy Casson is a British slalom canoeist who competed from the late 1990s to the early 2000s. She won a bronze medal in the K-1 team event at the 1999 ICF Canoe Slalom World Championships in La Seu d'Urgell.

References
ICF medalists for Olympic and World Championships - Part 2: rest of flatwater (now sprint) and remaining canoeing disciplines: 1936-2007.

British female canoeists
Living people
Year of birth missing (living people)
Place of birth missing (living people)
Medalists at the ICF Canoe Slalom World Championships